The Law of Gravity refers to the natural phenomenon known as gravitation.

Law(s) of Gravity may also refer to:

 "Law of Gravity" (CSI), an episode of CSI
 "Law of Gravity" (I Am Weasel), an episode of I Am Weasel
 "Laws of Gravity" (Oz), an episode of Oz
 Laws of Gravity (film), a 1992 American crime film